Bernard Whyte (born 22 October 1968) is a Ghanaian footballer. He played in six matches for the Ghana national football team in 1994. He was also named in Ghana's squad for the 1994 African Cup of Nations tournament.

References

1968 births
Living people
Ghanaian footballers
Ghana international footballers
1994 African Cup of Nations players
Place of birth missing (living people)
Association footballers not categorized by position